Meet the Smiths is a scripted reality series on TBS. It features NBA on TNT analyst Kenny Smith, The Price Is Right model  Gwendolyn Osborne-Smith and their five children. The series was picked up on September 30, 2014, with it to begin airing in Spring 2015. A sneak preview of the show aired February 13, 2015, on TNT and was uploaded to Facebook and the TBS website on March 13, 2015. The series officially premiered on April 3, 2015 on TBS.

Episodes

References

External links

2010s American reality television series
2015 American television series debuts
2015 American television series endings
English-language television shows
TBS (American TV channel) original programming
Television series by Good Clean Fun (production company)
Television series about families